Farmingdale High School is a public high school located in Farmingdale, Nassau County, New York, and is the only high school operated by the Farmingdale Union Free School District.
The school also serves East Farmingdale and a portion of North Amityville , Massapequa Park, and North Massapequa.

As of the 2018–19 school year, the school had an enrollment of 1,878 students and 142.0 classroom teachers (on an FTE basis), for a student–teacher ratio of 13.2:1.
There were 339 students (18.1% of enrollment) eligible for free lunch and 42 (2.2% of students) eligible for reduced-cost lunch.

Notable alumni
 Mark Mathew Braunstein (born 1951, class of 1969), author of Radical Vegetarianism and other books and nonfiction articles.
 Matt Danowski (born 1985, class of 2003), professional lacrosse player with the Chesapeake Bayhawks of Major League Lacrosse.
 William Gaddis (1922–1998, class of 1941), author of The Recognitions and other works of postmodern fiction.
 Ron Heller, (born 1962) American football player and later coach.
 George Hincape (born 1973 class of 1991), former American road bicycle racer
 Tom Kennedy (born 1995, class of 2013), current NFL player for the Detroit Lions.
 Klayton (born 1969), musician
 Tim Kubart (born 1984, class of 2002), co-host of the Sunny Side Up on Sprout and 2016 Grammy Award Winner for Best Children's Album.
 Jack Lamabe (1936–2007, class of 1954), former Major League Baseball pitcher.
 Frank Nappi (born 1967, class of 1985), author of The Legend of Mickey Tussler series and other novels.
 Joe Pantorno (born 1991, class of 2009), sports editor for amNewYork newspaper.
 SallyAnn Salsano (born 1974, class of 1992), creator of Jersey Shore and owner of 495 Productions.
 Al Weis (born 1938, class of 1955), former Major League Baseball player

References

Schools in Nassau County, New York
Public high schools in New York (state)